John Francis McCourt (9 July 1883 – 24 November 1948) was a Scottish professional football inside left who played in the Football League for Fulham.

Personal life 
McCourt was a teacher and by 1927 was headmaster of Laycock Street School in Islington, London.

Career statistics

References

Scottish footballers
Brentford F.C. players
English Football League players
Association football inside forwards
Southern Football League players
Celtic F.C. players
Croydon Common F.C. players
Sportspeople from Rutherglen
1883 births
Ayr United F.C. players
Royal Albert F.C. players
1948 deaths
Fulham F.C. players
Scottish Football League players
Scottish educators
Footballers from South Lanarkshire